Zhongxin may refer to:
 Zhongxin, Daozhen County, a town in Daozhen County, Guizhou, China

 Zhongxin, Huaping County, a town in Huaping County, Yunnan, China